A short-term exposure limit (STEL) is the acceptable average exposure over a short period of time, usually 15 minutes as long as the time-weighted average is not exceeded.

STEL is a term used in exposure assessment, occupational health, industrial hygiene and toxicology.  The STEL may be a legal limit in the United States for exposure of an employee to a chemical substance.  The Occupational Safety and Health Administration (U.S. OSHA) has set OSHA-STELs for 1,3-butadiene, benzene and ethylene oxide.  For chemicals, STEL assessments are usually done for 15 minutes and expressed in parts per million (ppm), or sometimes in milligrams per cubic meter (mg/m3).

The American Conference of Governmental Industrial Hygienists publishes a more extensive list of STELs as threshold limit values (TLV-STEL).

Similar national exposure limits 
United Kingdom
COSHH (Control of Substances Hazardous to Health).
Australia
OES Occupational Exposure Standard
France
VLEP 8h00 (Valeur Limite d’Exposition Professionnelle 8h00)
VLEP CT (Valeur Limite d’Exposition Professionnelle Court Terme)
Netherlands
MAC (Maximaal Aanvaarde Concentratie)
Malaysia
PEL (Permissible Exposure Limits)
Poland
NDSCh (Najwyższe dopuszczalne stężenie chwilowe)
Russia
ПДК (предельно допустимая концентрация)

See also
 Permissible exposure limit
 Exposure action value

Notes

Concentration indicators
Industrial hygiene
Occupational safety and health
Toxicology